Calw is a Landkreis (district) in the middle of Baden-Württemberg, Germany. Neighboring districts are (from north clockwise) Karlsruhe, Enz, the district-free city Pforzheim, Böblingen, Freudenstadt and Rastatt.

History 
The district was created in 1938, when the Oberamt Calw together with the neighboring Neuenbürg und Nagold were merged into a district. During the communal reform in 1973 the district at first was planned to be dissolved and its municipalities split to neighboring district. However it already had the right size and population which was planned for the newly created districts, and thus this plan was abandoned. But some changes in the outline of the districts happened - 15 municipalities of the district changed to the neighboring districts Enz, Rastatt and Böblingen, and in return it gained 6 municipalities from the districts Freudenstadt and the dissolved district Horb.

Geography 
The district belongs to the northern part of the Black Forest mountains. The main rivers are the Nagold and the Enz.

Partnerships
Since 1991 the district has partnership with the district Freiberg in Saxony.

Coat of arms 
The coat of arms, which is nearly identical with the coat of arms of the city Calw, shows the lion of the Counts of Calw on top of three mountains. The three mountains represent the three former counties over which the Counts of Calw once reigned, namely Calw, Löwenstein and Vaihingen. (The latter two cities are not part of the present-day district of Calw) The fountain in the bottom represents the springs and spas in the district.

Cities and towns

References

External links 

  (German)

 
Karlsruhe (region)
Districts of Baden-Württemberg